Sparging may refer to:

Sparging (chemistry), a process in which a gas is bubbled through a liquid to remove other gases or volatile compounds
Air sparging, a remediation process in which air is pushed through contaminated water or soil to remove volatile pollutants
Sparging, a step in lautering (a process used in brewing beer) in which water is trickled through the grain to extract sugars
Sparging, deodorization of edible oil by passing steam through it
Sparging, hydrogenation of edible oil using hydrogen and a catalyst